Edward Streeter (August 1, 1891 – March 31, 1976), sometimes credited as E. Streeter, was an American novelist and journalist, best known for the 1949 novel Father of the Bride and his Dere Mable series.

Biography 
Streeter was born in Buffalo, New York, and educated at Harvard University where he edited The Harvard Lampoon. He began his career as a reporter for the Buffalo newspaper the Buffalo Express as a war correspondent and travel writer. He grew in notoriety with his "Dere Mable" letters, a humorous column from an undereducated soldier writing home. Serialized between 1917 and 1919 in the 27th (NY) Division's magazine Gas Attack, they were inspired by Streeter's time spent on an army base (Camp Wadsworth, near Spartansburg SC) during World War I. The humorous letters were compiled in 1919 in Streeter's full-length books "Dere Mable", "Thats me all over, Mable", and "Same old Bill, eh Mable".

After returning home from the war, Streeter pursued writing casually, deciding to focus on his work as a businessman. For eight years he served as assistant vice president, before transitioning to the Fifth Avenue Bank (later, The Bank of New York) in New York City, where he served as vice president for twenty-five years.

While serving as VP of the bank, Streeter published short stories and articles in magazines such as the Saturday Evening Post and McCall's. In 1938, he published his first novel, Daily Except Sundays.  In 1944 he was elected to The Century Association, and remained a member for 32 years.  His next novel, the 1949 comic satire Father of the Bride, became an instant bestseller and was listed among The New York Times list of bestselling novels for the year. The following year's successful film adaptation starring Spencer Tracy and Elizabeth Taylor spawned multiple remakes, sequels, and a TV series.

After his breakthrough success, Streeter continued to write successful novels. Of the most notable of his subsequent works are Mr. Hobbs' Vacation (1954, filmed in 1962), Merry Christmas, Mr. Baxter (1956), Mr. Robbins Rides Again (1958), and Chairman of the Bored (1961). He also wrote two non-fiction books about his European travels: Skoal Scandinavia (1952) and Along the Ridge (1964). He finished his writing career with 1969's grim semi-autobiographical Ham Martin, Class of '17.

Streeter died on March 31, 1976, in New York City.

Bibliography
 "Dere Mable" (1918)
 "Thats me all over, Mable" (1919)
 "Same old Bill, eh Mable" (1919)
 Daily Except Sunday (1938)
 Father of the Bride (1949)
 Skoal Scandinavia (1952)
 Mr. Hobbs' Vacation (1954)
 Merry Christmas, Mr. Baxter (1956)
 Mr. Robbins Rides Again (1957)
 Window on America (1957)
 Chairman of the Bored (1961)
 Along the Ridge (1964)
 Ham Martin, Class of '17'' (1969)

References

External links 

 
 
 
Guide to The Edward Streeter Papers in the Fales Library of NYU

1891 births
1976 deaths
20th-century American novelists
American male novelists
American male journalists
Writers from Buffalo, New York
The Harvard Lampoon alumni
Journalists from New York (state)
20th-century American male writers
Novelists from New York (state)
20th-century American non-fiction writers
20th-century American journalists